Wilfred Cass CBE FRSA (11 November 1924 – 18 April 2022) co-founded the Cass Sculpture Foundation.

Biography
Cass was born in Berlin and came from the famous Jewish  Cassirer family. His great uncle, Paul Cassirer, was an important dealer for the impressionists in Europe. His grandfather was Richard Cassirer, the famous German brain surgeon, and his other great uncles included a publisher, an industrialist and the philosopher, Ernst Cassirer.

After the war, Cass worked in 1946–1947 as junior research engineer for Telephone Rentals in Knightsbridge, London, before embarking on an HND in Communication Technology at the Regent Street Polytechnic in London between 1947 and 1951.

In 1979, Cass and his son, Mark, set up Image Bank UK, part of The Image Bank, and this company was successfully sold to Getty Images in 2001.

In 1987 Cass became Chairman and Chief Executive of Moss Bros Plc, where he reorganised the whole of the troubled group including moving and selling its head office, starting up a new range of Suit Shops and buying Cecil Gee Plc. He remained at the company until 1991.

Upon retiring from Moss Bros in 1992, Cass moved from London to West Sussex, where he co-founded the registered charity, The Cass Sculpture Foundation, previously known as Sculpture at Goodwood, in 1992. Over the next year, they visited some thirty sculpture parks around the world before deciding upon the style, aim and design of their own estate. Long-term friends of Henry Moore and Elisabeth Frink, Wilfred and Jeannette sold their own personal collection of Moores, Frinks and Ayrtons, which they had bought directly from these artists, to fund the creation of their park.

Based in Goodwood, West Sussex, the charitable foundation's aim and consistent focus is to promote and advance British sculpture to a global audience and through a vigorous programme of commissioning, funding and marketing, the Foundation has enabled the fabrication of 150 major new works by leading British artists. In 1996, the charity won the National Art Collections Fund prize for "Promoting Enjoyment of the Visual Arts".

Cass was created a Commander of the Order of the British Empire (CBE) on 17 June 2006.

In April 2008 Cass was awarded an honorary degree from the Open University as Doctor of the University.

In later life, Cass lived in the grounds of the Cass Sculpture Foundation's sculpture park in Goodwood, near Chichester, West Sussex, with his wife Jeannette.

Cass died on 18 April 2022, at the age of 97.

Portraits of Wilfred Cass
The National Portrait Gallery collection includes a portrait of Wilfred and Jeannette Cass by Anne-Katrin Purkiss. In 2008 Cass sat for a portrait sculpture in terracotta by Jon Edgar which is in the collection of the sitter and was exhibited at Yorkshire Sculpture Park in 2013 as part of the Sculpture Series Heads.

See also
 The Guardian
 The Telegraph

See also
 Wilfred Cass's Full Biography at Sculpture.org.uk
 Cass Sculpture Foundation official site

References

 Frances Follin, 'Wilfred Cass, co-Founder of the Cass Sculpture Foundation, is 90!', in Cassone: The International Online Magazine of Art and Art Books, November 2014 http://www.cassone-art.com/magazine/article/2014/11/wilfred-cass-champion-of-british-sculpture/?psrc=perspectives

1924 births
2022 deaths
English art collectors
Commanders of the Order of the British Empire
Alumni of the University of Westminster
Jewish emigrants from Nazi Germany to the United Kingdom
People from Berlin